Siegbert Horn (11 May 1950 – 9 August 2016) was a German slalom canoeist who competed in the 1970s. He won a gold medal in the K-1 event at the 1972 Summer Olympics in Munich.

Horn also won six medals at the ICF Canoe Slalom World Championships with three golds (K-1: 1971, 1975; K-1 team: 1973), two silvers (K-1: 1973; K-1 team: 1971), and a bronze (K-1 team: 1975). He died of cancer on 9 August 2016.

References

External links 

1950 births
2016 deaths
People from Elbe-Elster
German male canoeists
Sportspeople from Brandenburg
Olympic canoeists of East Germany
Canoeists at the 1972 Summer Olympics
Olympic gold medalists for East Germany
Olympic medalists in canoeing
Medalists at the 1972 Summer Olympics
Medalists at the ICF Canoe Slalom World Championships
Recipients of the Patriotic Order of Merit in silver